Noise is a variety of sound, usually meaning any unwanted sound.

Noise may also refer to:

Science and technology 
 Noise (spectral phenomenon), referring to many types of random or unwanted signals, including acoustic noise
 Noise (signal processing)
 Noise (electronics)
 Noise (economic), in a theory of pricing developed by Fischer Black
 Communication noise, factors that impair human-to-human communication
 Internet background noise, data packets addressed to IP addresses or ports where there is no device to receive them
 Meta noise, irrelevant metadata in computer files
 Noise trader, in financial research, a stock trader that makes random decisions
 Noise pollution, excessive sound
 Noise control
 Environmental noise
 Ambient noise level

Arts and entertainment

Film and television 
 Noise (2005 film), a Canadian short film directed by Greg Spottiswood
 Noise (2007 American film), a comedy-drama written and directed by Henry Bean
 Noise (2007 Australian film), a drama written and directed by Matthew Saville
 Noise (programming block), a Fuji TV late-night anime programming block
 The Noise (TV series), a 1996 magazine show on ITV
 The Noise (game show), on Universal Kids
 New York Noise, an indie rock music video TV program by NYCTV, 2003–2009

Journalism and literature 
 Noise: The Political Economy of Music, a 1977 nonfiction book by Jacques Attali
 The Noise, a monthly newspaper in Northern Arizona (1993–2017)
 NOiSE, a 2000 manga by Tsutomu Nihei
 Noise (book), a 2006 popular science book by Bart Kosko
 Noise: A Flaw in Human Judgment, a 2021 nonfiction book by Daniel Kahneman, Olivier Sibony, and Cass Sunstein

Music 
 Noise in music, the occurrence of noise(s) in music, including noise reduction and uses in instrument tone, in composition and in performance
 String noise, made by guitar players sliding the fingers over the strings

Genres 
 Noise music, a noise-based aesthetic in experimental music and sound art
 Power noise, a derivative of noise music
 Noise pop, an alternative rock genre developed in the UK in the mid-1980s
 Noise rock, a style of rock music prominent in the 1980s
 Japanese noise rock

Musical artists 
 The Noise (band), a Puerto Rican musical collective
 The Noise (string quartet), an experimental string quartet from Sydney, Australia
 Noise, an American band including Mika Horiuchi

Musical recordings 
 Noise (Archive album), 2004
 Noise (Boris album), 2014
 NOISE (compilation album), released by Adult Swim, 2016
 The Noise (album), by Peter Hamill, 1993
 Le Noise, an album by Neil Young, 2010
 Noise, an album by DecembeRadio, 2005
 "Noise" (Kenny Chesney song), 2016
 "Noise" (Nightwish song), 2020
 Noises (song), a 2018 song by Pale Waves

Other uses in music 
 Noise Pop Festival, an indie rock festival started 1993 in San Francisco
 Noise Records, a German record label founded in 1983

Other uses in arts and entertainment 
 Noise (video game company), a second-party video game developer for Nintendo

Sport 
 Knoxville Noise, a basketball franchise in Knoxville, Tennessee
 Nashville Noise, a basketball franchise in Nashville, Tennessee

Other uses 
 Noise (Goidelic mythology) or Naoise, a figure in Irish mythology
 The Noises, an island group in northern New Zealand

See also 
 White noise (disambiguation)
 The Noise Company, an American record label
 Noize MC (born 1985), Russian rapper